This is a list of weather records, a list of the most extreme occurrences of weather phenomena for various categories. Many weather records are measured under specific conditions—such as surface temperature and wind speed—to keep consistency among measurements around the Earth. Each of these records is understood to be the record value officially observed, as these records may have been exceeded before modern weather instrumentation was invented, or in remote areas without an official weather station. This list does not include remotely sensed observations such as satellite measurements, since those values are not considered official records.

Temperature

Measuring conditions
The following lists include all officially confirmed claims measured by those methods.

The Lut Desert was also found to have the highest maximum temperature in five of the seven years measured (2004, 2005, 2006, 2007 and 2009). These measurements reflect averages over a large region and so are lower than the maximum point surface temperature.

Hottest

Highest temperatures ever recorded 

as possible problems with the reading have since been discovered. Christopher C. Burt, a weather historian writing for Weather Underground, believes that the 1913 Death Valley reading is "a myth", and is at least  too high. Burt proposes that the highest reliably recorded temperature on Earth could still be at Death Valley, but is instead  recorded on 30 June 2013. The WMO has stated they stand by the 1913 record pending any future investigations.

The former highest official temperature on Earth, measured in 'Aziziya, Libya on 13 September 1922, was reassessed in July 2012 by the WMO which published a report that invalidated the record. There have been other unconfirmed reports of high temperatures, but these temperatures have never been officially validated by national weather services/WMO, and are currently considered to have been recorder's errors, thus not being recognised as world records.

By continent

Africa

Antarctica

Asia

Europe

North America

Oceania

South America

Other high-temperature records
 Highest "feels like" temperature 81.1°C (178°F): In Dhahran, Saudi Arabia on 8 July 2003.
 Most consecutive days above 37.8 °C (100 °F): 160 days; Marble Bar, Western Australia from 31 October 1923 to 7 April 1924.
 Most consecutive days above 48.9 °C (120 °F): 43 days; Death Valley, California from 6 July through 17 August 1917.
 Highest natural ground surface temperature: , in Death Valley, California, 15 July 1972.
 Highest temperature during rain:  48.3 °C (119.0 °F) in Imperial, California, 24 July 2018
 Highest overnight low temperature:  at the Khasab weather station (WMO Index = 41241) in Oman on 17 June 2017.
 Highest minimum temperature for a 24-hour period and for a calendar day:  at Qurayyat, Oman on 25 June 2018.
 Highest average monthly temperature: , in Death Valley, California, for the month of July 2018.
 Highest temperature north of the Arctic Circle:  in Verkhoyansk, Russia on 20 June 2020.
 Highest temperature ever recorded north of the 50th parallel north:  at Lytton, British Columbia, Canada.

Humidity
 Highest dew point temperature: A dew point of  — while the temperature was  — was observed at Dhahran, Saudi Arabia, at 3:00 p.m. on 8 July 2003.

Coldest

Lowest temperatures recorded

By continent

Africa

Antarctica

Asia

Europe

North America

South America

Oceania

Other low-temperature records
 Coldest summer (month of July in the Northern Hemisphere): ; Summit Camp, Greenland on 4 July 2017.
 Lowest temperature in the Northern Hemisphere: ; Greenland Ice Sheet, Greenland on 22 December 1991.

Record extreme temperature differences
 Fastest temperature drop: 27.2 °C (49 °F) in 5 minutes; Rapid City, South Dakota, 10 January 1911.

Precipitation

Rain
 Most in 60 seconds (1 minute): . Barot, Sainte-Anne, Grande-Terre, Guadeloupe, France 11:03–11:04 am on 26 November 1970.
 Most in 180 seconds (3 minutes): . Portobelo, Colón, Panama, 29 November 1911
 Most in 300 seconds (5 minutes): . Oklahoma, United States, 29 November 1911
 Most in 60 minutes (1 hour): . Holt, Missouri, United States, 22 June 1947.
 Most in 12 hours (-day): ; Cilaos, Réunion, 8 January 1966, during Tropical Cyclone Denise.
 Most in 24 hours (1 day): ; Cilaos, Réunion, 7–8 January 1966, during Tropical Cyclone Denise.
 Most in 48 hours (2 days): ; Cherrapunji, Meghalaya, India, 15–16 June 1995.
 Most in 72 hours (3 days): ; Commerson, Réunion, 24–26 February 2007, during Cyclone Gamede.
 Most in 96 hours (4 days): ; Commerson, Réunion, 24–27 February 2007, during Cyclone Gamede.
 Most in one year: ; Cherrapunji, Meghalaya, India, 1860–1861.
 Most from a single tropical cylone: ; Commerson, Réunion, during Cyclone Hyacinthe in January 1980.
 Most consecutive days with measurable rain a day with at least  of rainfall: 331 days in Oahu, Hawaii, 1939-1940

Snow
Most in a 24-hour period:  of snow on Mount Ibuki, Japan on 14 February 1927.
Most in one calendar month: 9.91 meters (390 inches) of snow fell in Tamarack, California in January 1911, leading to a snow depth in March of 11.46 meters (451 inches) (greatest measured in North America).
Most in one season (1 July – 30 June): 29.0 meters, (95 ft); Mount Baker, Washington, United States, 1998 through 1999.
 Most in one-year period: 31.5 meters (102 ft); Mount Rainier, Washington, United States, 19 February 1971 to 18 February 1972.
Deepest snowfall recorded: 11.82 meters (38.8 ft) on Mount Ibuki, Japan on 14 February 1927.
 Lowest latitude that snow has been recorded at sea level in North America: Snow fell as far south as the city of Tampico, Mexico in February 1895 during the Great Freeze.

Wind speeds
 Fastest ever recorded: 484±32 km/h (301±20 mph) (3-second gust); observed by a DOW (Doppler On Wheels) radar unit in the 1999 Bridge Creek – Moore tornado between Oklahoma City and Moore, Oklahoma, USA, 3 May 1999.
 Fastest non-tornadic winds:  (3-second gust); recorded by anemometer in Severe Tropical Cyclone Olivia passing over Barrow Island, Western Australia, 10 April 1996.
 Fastest non-cyclonic winds: 372 km/h (231 mph) (1-minute average); recorded by anemometer on Mount Washington, New Hampshire, USA, 12 April 1934.
 Fastest daily average: 174 km/h (108 mph); Port Martin (Adélie Land), Antarctica, 24-hour period from 21 March 1951 to 22 March 1951.

Tornadoes

Deadliest in history 
 On Earth: Approximately 1,300 deaths (Daulatpur–Saturia tornado); Manikganj District, Bangladesh on 26 April 1989.
 In North America: 695 deaths (Tri-State Tornado); Missouri, Illinois, Indiana, United States, 18 March 1925.
 In Europe: 600 or more deaths (Grand Harbour Tornado); Valletta, Malta, 23 September 1551 or 1556 (sources conflict).
 In South America: 63 deaths, San Justo, Santa Fe, Argentina, 10 January 1973.
 In Australia: Three deaths, Kin Kin, Queensland tornado, 14 August 1971.

Outbreaks

 Largest and most severe: The 2011 Super Outbreak: 207 confirmed tornadoes occurred in a span of 24 hours, with a total of 337 occurring throughout the duration of the outbreak.  They affected six US states, and included 11 rated EF4 and 4 rated EF5.

Tropical cyclones

Most intense (by minimum surface air pressure)
 Most intense ever recorded: 870 hPa (25.69 inHg); eye of Super Typhoon Tip over the northwest Pacific Ocean, 12 October 1979.
 Most intense in the Western Hemisphere: 872 hPa (25.75 inHg); eye of Hurricane Patricia over the eastern Pacific Ocean, 23 October 2015.
 Most intense ever recorded on land: 892 hPa (26.35 inHg); Craig Key, Florida, United States, eye of the Labor Day Hurricane, 2 September 1935.  While other landfalling tropical cyclones potentially had lower pressures, data is vague from areas other than the Atlantic basin, especially before the invention of weather satellites.
 Most intense landfall (estimated): 884 hPa (26.10 inHg); Rakiraki District, Viti Levu, Fiji, during Cyclone Winston, 20 February 2016. Although no official land pressure readings were recorded at the landfall site, it is estimated the Winston made landfall with the aforementioned pressure.

Most precipitation

 Most precipitation from a single tropical storm: ; Commerson, Réunion, during Cyclone Hyacinthe in January 1980.

Other severe weather

Hail

 Heaviest officially recorded: ; Gopalganj District, Bangladesh, 14 April 1986.
 Largest diameter officially measured:  diameter,  circumference; Vivian, South Dakota, 23 July 2010.
 Largest circumference officially measured:  circumference,  diameter; Aurora, Nebraska, 22 June 2003.

Lightning
 Longest lightning bolt:  on 29 April 2020 in the southern United States.
 Longest duration for a single lightning flash: 17.1 seconds on 18 June 2020 in Uruguay and northern Argentina.

Ultraviolet index
 Highest ultraviolet index measured: On 29 December 2003, a UV index of 43.3 was detected at Chile/Bolivia's Licancabur volcano, at  altitude. A light-skinned individual in such conditions may experience moderate sunburn in as little as 4 minutes.

Other categories

 Highest air pressure ever recorded [above 750 meters (2,461 feet)]: 1,084.8 hPa (32.03 inHg); Tosontsengel, Zavkhan, Mongolia, 19 December 2001.
The highest adjusted-to-sea-level barometric pressure ever recorded (below 750 meters) was at Agata, Evenhiyskiy, Russia (66°53'N, 93°28'E, elevation: 261 m (856.3 ft)) on 31 December 1968 of 1,083.3 hectopascals (hPa) (31.99 inHg). 
The discrimination is due to the problematic assumptions (assuming a standard lapse rate) associated with reduction of sea level from high elevations.

See also

 Weather of 2013
 Extremes on Earth
 List of extreme temperatures in Canada
 List of snowiest places in the United States by state
 U.S. state and territory temperature extremes
 United Kingdom weather records
 Weather extremes in Canada
 Climate change

Notes

References

External links
 National Climate Extremes Committee 
 Global Weather & Climate Extremes (Arizona State University)
 Weather and Climate Extremes from US Army Corps of Engineers